In the election for Head of State of Costa Rica held between 3 and 16 February 1833, Manuel Aguilar Chacón, supported by liberal groups from San Jose and Alajuela, obtained 21 electoral votes cast by the second-degree electors elected by universal male suffrage weeks before. However, the minimum necessary to win was 22 votes according to the Constitution at the time, thus the election was declared null and it would correspond to the Parliament, then called the Constitutional Congress, to choose the Head of State, choosing conservative and monarchist José Rafael de Gallegos y Alvarado.

References

Elections in Costa Rica
1833 elections in Central America
1833 in Costa Rica